Campion School is a co-educational secondary school in Bugbrooke, about  from Northampton, Northamptonshire. Founded in 1969, it became a Language College in September 1997, and in 2011 the school became an academy.
The school had 1397 students on roll for the 2014-2015 school year, with 71 teaching staff and 19 teaching assistants. In 2020 the school had 1738 students on roll, 69 Teaching staff and 21 teaching assistants.

History 
The original buildings were built from 1966 to 1968 by the county architect's department and it was the first purpose-built comprehensive school in Northamptonshire. Extensions were added in 1971-2.

Performance and achievement 
The school's latest full Ofsted inspection was in 2018, when the school was found to be "insufficient" in all areas, except for the sixth form.  A section 8 report in 2015 which focused on the progress of disadvantaged students (the main weakness in the previous report) showed mixed results.

GCSE achievement (English and Maths) 

Source:

Catchment area 
The following are among the school's current catchment area:

Notable former pupils
Trevor Lock, comedian and playwright.
Tom MacRae, TV and film and playwright
Jo Whiley, BBC Radio 2 presenter.

References

External links 
Northants County Council school data
League Table Results at the BBC
Campion School Podcast

Academies in West Northamptonshire District
Educational institutions established in 1967
Secondary schools in West Northamptonshire District
1967 establishments in England